Rowan Osborne (born 17 September 1946) is a British retired slalom canoeist who competed in the early 1970s. He finished 20th in the C-1 event at the 1972 Summer Olympics in Munich.

References
Sports-reference.com profile

External links 
A summary of Rowan Osborne’s paddling achievements (British Canoe Union Slalom Competitions) can be found at CanoeingResults.com

1946 births
Canoeists at the 1972 Summer Olympics
Living people
Olympic canoeists of Great Britain
British male canoeists